FC Motown is an American soccer club based in Morristown, New Jersey. Founded in 2012, the team currently plays in both the National Premier Soccer League (NPSL) and USL League Two. In 2020, the team joined the newly formed Northeast Elite Soccer League (NESL) and formed a U23 team that competed in the EDP 23U league.

The team plays its home games at Drew University's Ranger Stadium and Montclair State University's MSU Soccer Park. Since 2022, the club's NPSL team has been coached by former New York Red Bulls player Gideon Baah.

Motown has one league championship in the franchise history, winning the 2022 National Premier Soccer League National Championship.

History
FC Morristown was founded in 2012 by Scott Kindzierski and Dan Karosen and began play in the Garden State Soccer League (GSSL), an amateur soccer league for teams based in the state of New Jersey. While fully amateur, the team qualified for the 2017 U.S. Open Cup by beating tournament regular Lansdowne Bhoys FC, 3–2. The team advanced to the second round by beating NPSL side New Jersey Copa FC, 2–1, before falling to Rochester Rhinos of the United Soccer League, 3–0.

In 2017, the team began working with NPSL side Clarkstown SC Eagles and supplied most of Clarkstown's players and staff. Following the season, Clarkstown Eagles re-branded as FC Motown in late 2017.

The following year, Motown finished atop the Keystone Conference table (regular season record of 9–1–0) before winning the conference playoffs all-together by beating West Chester United SC in the final. In the Regional and National Playoff, Motown reached the national final by beating FC Baltimore, New York Cosmos B, and FC Mulhouse Portland with a combined score of 8–3. In the final, the team would fall at home to Miami FC 2, 3–1, in front of a sold-out crowd of 2,143.

Motown still fields a team in the GSSL and are eight-time Super Division Champions, winning the title in 2014, 2015, 2016, 2017, 2018, 2019, 2020, and 2022. Entering the 2018 season, FC Motown had a 23-game undefeated streak in the GSSL before falling to Jackson Lions FC in the middle of the season.

In addition the team was also a Fricker Cup Region 1 finalist in 2016 and regional semifinalist in 2017.  The team was also an Amateur Cup Region 1 semifinalist in 2014 and 2015.

Motown took part in the inaugural Lower League eCup during the summer of 2020, a lower league eSports FIFA competition, winning the PS4 title with player Deiver Lopez.

Once back on the field in 2020, the team won the NJ State Cup title defeating Clifton, and the GSSL Super Division title defeating Clifton. The team also formed a U23 team which competed in the EDP and went 7–0 winning the men's central red division.

On January 13, 2021, Motown joined USL League Two alongside its NPSL squad, U23 team, and local amateur sides. Northern Ireland native and NPSL assistant coach Alan McClintock was named head coach of the USL side on March 15, 2021.

FC Motown won the 2022 National Premier Soccer League season Championship beating Crossfire Redmond 4–3 in the championship game. The final at MSU Soccer Park at Pittser Field was attended by 2,065 people. The team defeated teams such as West Chester United, Appalachian FC, and Tulsa Athletic en route to the final. Earlier the same year Motown competed in the 2022 U.S. Open Cup tournament and finished with its best performance to date. The team reached the third round, beating West Chester and National Independent Soccer Association side AC Syracuse Pulse. The team fell to Rochester New York FC (formerly the Rochester Rhinos) in penalty kicks in the next round but earned $25,000 as the farthest reaching Open Division that year.

FC Motown has had multiple players sign professional contracts off its squad during its brief history such as Joe Fala with New York Red Bulls 2 and has signed professional talent such as former New York Red Bulls star Dilly Duka and New York Cosmos midfielder Jimmy Mulligan among others. The team has had friendlies against professional teams such as New York City FC, New York Red Bulls II, the Ecuadorian U-20 National Football Team, Peruvian side Sport Boys, and a controlled scrimmage with the Ecuador national football team.

Players & staff

Coaches
  Šaćir Hot (2012–2022) NPSL Head Coach
  Gideon Baah (2022– ) NPSL Head Coach
 Alan McClintock (2018– ) U23 Head Coach, (2020– ) USL2 Head Coach (2023– )

Current squad

Notable players
This list of notable former players comprises players who went on to play professional soccer after playing for the team or those who previously played professionally before joining the team.

Record

Year-by-year

Honors

U.S. Open Cup
Participants (4): 2017, 2018, 2019, 2022
Additional qualification (1): 2020

References

External links
 

National Premier Soccer League teams
USL League Two teams
Soccer clubs in the New York metropolitan area
2012 establishments in New Jersey
Association football clubs established in 2012